Nureshk (also Romanized as Nūreshḵ; also known as Rūshenḵ) is a village in Shusef Rural District, Shusef District, Nehbandan County, South Khorasan Province, Iran. At the 2006 census, its population was 19, in 6 families.

References 

Populated places in Nehbandan County